Brooklyn is the name of some places in the U.S. state of Wisconsin:

Brooklyn (village), Wisconsin, a village in Dane and Green Counties
Brooklyn, Green County, Wisconsin, a town
Brooklyn, Green Lake County, Wisconsin, a town
Brooklyn, Washburn County, Wisconsin, a town